Crocomela regia is a moth of the subfamily Arctiinae. It was described by Warren in 1901. It is found in Ecuador.

References

Arctiinae
Moths described in 1901